Coorg State was a Part-C state in India which existed from 1950 to 1956. When the Constitution of India came into force on 26 January 1950, most of the existing provinces were reconstituted into states. Thus, Coorg Province became Coorg State. Coorg State was ruled by a Chief Commissioner with Mercara as its capital. The head of the government was the Chief Minister. Coorg State was abolished on 1 November 1956 as per the States Reorganisation Act, 1956 and its territory were merged with Mysore State (later renamed as Karnataka in 1973). Presently, Coorg forms a district of Karnataka state.

History

The Coorg State came into being on 26 January 1950 as per the Constitution of India. Prior to the enactment of the Constitution, Coorg had been a province of the Dominion of India.

The first legislative elections in Coorg were held in 1952. The main contenders were the Indian National Congress led in the state by C. M. Poonacha and the Takkadi party led by the Gandhian Pandyanda Belliappa. While the Congress supported merger with the neighbouring Mysore State, the Takkadi party fought the election on an anti-merger plank. The Indian National Congress won a majority of 15 seats while the Takkadi party bagged the remaining nine seats.

Commissioners of Coorg State

(1) Dewan Bahadur Ketolira Chengappa, became its first Chief Commissioner from 1947–1949

(2) C.T. Mudaliar became Chief Commissioner from 1949 - 1950

(3) Kanwar Baba Daya Singh Bedi, Chief Commissioner from 1950 - 1956

Government of Coorg
Government was formed in Coorg by Indian National Congress, who won 15 of 24 seats. Cabinet was formed with two ministers (including Chief Minister), which lasted till States Reorganisation Act on 1 November 1956.

Chief Minister

Cheppudira Muthana Poonacha won from Berriathnad constituency became the first and last Chief Minister of Coorg State from 1950 till 1956.

Cabinet
 Cheppudira Muthana Poonacha, who was the Chief Minister took the charge of Ministry of Finance for Coorg State.
 Kuttur Mallapa (elected to the assembly from the Sanivarsanthe constituency became the Home Minister of Coorg State

Dissolution

As a result of the States Reorganisation Act of 1 November 1956, when India's state boundaries were reorganised, Coorg State became a district of the then Mysore State Mysore State was later renamed as Karnataka and part of the historical region of Coorg now forms the Kodagu district of Karnataka.

See also
History of Kodagu
Captivity of Coorgis at Seringapatam

References

Further reading

External links
Coorg State Legal Status 1956

 
Historical Indian regions
Political integration of India
States and territories disestablished in 1956
1950 establishments in India
History of Karnataka (1947–present)
Coorg
Mysore State
Gubernatorial titles